Keychi (also Romanized as Keychī and Kī Chī; also known as Gachī, Kachī, Kechī, Qeychī, and Qīchi) is a village in Keraj Rural District, in the Central District of Isfahan County, Isfahan Province, Iran. At the 2006 census, its population was 264, in 67 families.

References 

Populated places in Isfahan County